George James "Soldier Boy" Curry (December 23, 1888 – October 5, 1963) was a Major League Baseball pitcher.

External links
Baseball Reference.com

1888 births
1963 deaths
St. Louis Browns players
Major League Baseball pitchers
Sportspeople from Bridgeport, Connecticut
Baseball players from Connecticut